The Mahlac River is a river stream in the United States territory of Guam. The river is at a elevation of 98 feet at 13° 21' 08" N 144° 43' 46" E. The mahlac river lies nearby the fena valley reserve.

See also
List of rivers of Guam

References

Rivers of Guam